The State Register of Heritage Places is maintained by the Heritage Council of Western Australia. , 42 places are heritage-listed in the Shire of Yalgoo, of which eleven are on the State Register of Heritage Places.

List
The Western Australian State Register of Heritage Places, lists the following eleven state registered places within the Shire of Yalgoo:

 † Denotes building has been demolished

References

Yalgoo
 
Yalgoo